"Where the Party At" is a song by American R&B group Jagged Edge featuring guest vocals from Nelly. The song spent three weeks at number-one on the US R&B chart. It was the group's highest-charting single on the US Billboard Hot 100, spending five weeks at number three starting the week of September 15, 2001.

The song was nominated for Best Rap/Sung Collaboration at the 44th Grammy Awards in 2002, a brand new category at the time. It lost to Eve and Gwen Stefani's "Let Me Blow Ya Mind".

Remix
The official remix of "Where the Party At" is remixed by Jermaine Dupri, and features him, alongside Da Brat, Lil Bow Wow, and Tigah.

Charts

Weekly charts

Year-end charts

Release history

References

External links
 "Where the Party At" music video at YouTube
 "Where the Party At" (remix) music video at YouTube

2001 singles
2001 songs
Columbia Records singles
Jagged Edge (American group) songs
Nelly songs
Song recordings produced by Jermaine Dupri
Songs written by Bryan-Michael Cox
Songs written by Jermaine Dupri
Songs written by Nelly